Henri Govard (2 February 1922 – 22 October 1975) was a Belgian footballer. He played in six matches for the Belgium national football team from 1948 to 1949.

References

External links
 

1922 births
1975 deaths
Belgian footballers
Belgium international footballers
Place of birth missing
Association footballers not categorized by position